Thomas Philip Christie (born May 28, 1934 in Pensacola, Florida) is an American defense analyst who worked for the U.S. government.

Christie graduated from Spring Hill College with a B.S. degree in mathematics in May 1955 and from New York University with an M.S. degree in applied mathematics in September 1962.

Christie served for nine years as director of the operational evaluation division (OED) at the Institute for Defense Analyses, a federally funded research and development center. Christie was responsible for independent analyses of more than two hundred major test and evaluation programs and was also involved in weapons testing.

Christie became director of Operational Test and Evaluation in June 2001.

Energy–maneuverability theory

Christie is often associated with John Boyd and other associates of Boyd who were critical of U.S. defense policies.  While working with Boyd at Eglin AFB, Christie was deeply involved with the development of the Energy-Maneuverability theory of aerial combat. The work on this theory was not officially sanctioned and Christie and Boyd resorted to "stealing" computer time to compare the performance of U.S. and Soviet military aircraft which resulted in the publication of a two volume report in 1964.  Despite the manner in which the Energy-Maneuverability theory was developed, it was accepted by the U.S. military and influenced the design of the successful F-15, F-16 and F-18 fighters.

Awards
Over the years, Christie has received numerous awards and citations including the Presidential Rank, Distinguished Executive Award (1983); the Presidential Rank, Meritorious Executive Award (two awards - 1980 and 1987); the Department of Defense Distinguished Civilian Service Award (four awards – 1979, 1981, 1983, and 1989); and the Air Force Scientific Achievement Award (two awards – 1965 and 1970).

References

External links
All Guns, No Butter, In These Times, 8 August 2008

1934 births
Living people
People from Pensacola, Florida
Spring Hill College alumni
New York University alumni
Military strategists
United States defense policymaking